Kabani Nadi Chuvannappol (When the River Kabani Turned Red) is a 1975 Malayalam feature film directed by P. A. Backer, produced by Pavithran, and starring T. V. Chandran, Shalini, Raveendran and J. Siddiqui. This leftist political drama film came out during the Emergency period. It was the directorial debut of P. A. Backer, who won that year's awards for Best Director and Second Best Film at the Kerala State Film Awards. Pavithran, who later directed many critically acclaimed Malayalam films produced the film. T. V. Chandran, who also later went on to direct a bevy of award-winning films in Malayalam and Tamil, played the lead role. After certain post-production controversies, the film debuted in theatres on 16 July 1976.

Plot
The film is a love story between a young woman (Shalini) and a radical political activist (T. V. Chandran), who is declared to be Naxalite. The film ends with the police killing him and the woman learning about his death through the newspaper.

Cast 
 
TV Chandran 
Salam Karassery
J Sidhiq
Laila
Miss Don 
Pailunni 
Salini 
K. Ravindran

Production and release
The principal production started in June 1975. The day when shoot of the film commenced in Bangalore, Emergency was declared in India. Strict warnings by the Government against any act that supported extremist activity left P. A. Backer, in two minds for the film had a Naxalite as its hero. Both Backer and Chandran sought Pavithran's opinion who had said, "Let's go ahead.".

The film was screened at several film festivals in 1975. It was not given the censor certificate for the theme it dealt with for more than a year. It released in theatres during the Emergency period itself, on 16 July 1976.

The English title of the film is When the River Kabani Turned Red.

Awards
 Kerala State Film Awards
 Second Best Film - P. A. Backer (director), Pavithran (producer)
 Best Director - P. A. Backer

References

External links
 
 Kabani Nadi Chuvannappol at the Malayalam Movie Database

1970s Malayalam-language films
1976 drama films
1976 films
1976 directorial debut films
Films directed by P. A. Backer